Smith-Giltinan House is a historic home located at Charleston, West Virginia.  It is a three-story dwelling with an asymmetrical plan. It was built about 1888 and many of its details are in the Queen Anne style. It features an asymmetrical plan, projecting bays, varied materials and textures, and elaborate porch details. The house is six bays wide by six bays deep and the roof is basically a steeply pitched hip shape, covered with asphalt shingles. There is a polygonal tower on the north side.

It was listed on the National Register of Historic Places in 2002.

References

Houses in Charleston, West Virginia
Houses completed in 1888
Houses on the National Register of Historic Places in West Virginia
National Register of Historic Places in Charleston, West Virginia
Queen Anne architecture in West Virginia